Roland Glasser (born 1973), is a literary translator, working from French into English.

Awards and honours 
 His translation of Fiston Mwanza Mujila’s Tram 83 won the 2015 Etisalat Prize for Literature and was longlisted for the 2016 Man Booker International Prize and the Best Translated Book Award.
 His translation of Adeline Dieudonné's Real Life was shortlisted for the 2021 Scott Moncrieff Prize

Translation work 
Roland Glasser has translated a range of authors, including Adeline Dieudonné, Anne Cuneo, Martin Page (French author)
, Marc Pouyet, Stéphane Garnier, Julien Aranda, and Ludovic Flamant. He has also contributed articles and essays to The White Review, Asymptote, Literary Hub, Chimurenga, In Other Words, and the Fitzrovia and Bloomsbury Journals.

Translations of books 
 2020 - Real Life by Adeline Dieudonné (World Editions)
 2017 - Seasons of the Moon by Julien Aranda (AmazonCrossing)
 2017 - How to Live Like Your Cat by Stéphane Garnier (4th Estate)
 2015 - Tram 83 by Fiston Mwanza Mujila (Deep Vellum)
 2015 - Tregian’s Ground by Anne Cuneo (And Other Stories) - co-translated with Louise Rogers Lalaurie
 2015 - Dance of the Angels by Robert Morcet (AmazonCrossing)

References

External links 
 Glasser in the Institut Français Translators DirectoryÁĔ
 Glasser interviewed on Words Without Borders website
 Glasser on ENGLISH Pen website

Living people
British translators
French–English translators
Literary translators
1973 births